CHWF-FM (106.9 The Wolf) is a Canadian radio station located in Nanaimo, British Columbia, operating on 106.9 FM under the ownership of Jim Pattison Group division Island Radio.

History
CHWF signed on for the first time on July 1, 1981 on its original frequency of 1350 AM as CKEG, Nanaimo's second radio station (after the long-established CHUB), broadcasting a country format from the beginning and operating 24 hours a day with transmission power of 10,000 watts. The station was established by Central Island Broadcasting Ltd. (under the ownership of founders Bob Adshead and Ted Schellenberg), and from the beginning, operated with a local focus, both in its news reporting and in its service to the community.

In 1992, CKEG relocated to its present offices and studios in the north end of Nanaimo. Parent company Central Island Broadcasting, with approval from the CRTC, acquired Benchmark Ventures (the owner of CHUB at the time) in 1994, subsequently relocating CHUB to share CKEG's facilities, then switching CHUB to the FM band (at 102.3 FM) and renaming it CKWV in 1995, while CKEG moved to the old CHUB frequency of 1570 AM; by 1999, CKEG switched music formats from country to oldies and adopted the on-air name Good Time Oldies.

CKEG would eventually also switch to FM, moving to its present frequency and becoming CHWF on September 28, 2001, with its current format of active rock; it continued simulcasting on 1570 AM until February 15, 2002. Central Island Broadcasting changed its corporate name to Island Radio in 2005, reflecting its expanded presence on Vancouver Island with the establishment of Courtenay station CKLR-FM, the ownership of Parksville stations CIBH-FM and CHPQ-FM, and the acquisition of Port Alberni station CJAV.

On November 1, 2005, the Jim Pattison Broadcast Group and Island Radio Ltd. announced that Island Radio had agreed to sell its six radio stations (including CHWF) to the Jim Pattison Broadcast Group; following CRTC approval, Pattison assumed control of the stations at midnight on June 30, 2006.

On July 24, 2020, CHWF morning show host Ron Jones retired after 31 years on the air.

References

External links
106.9 The Wolf
 
 

Hwf
Hwf
Hwf
Radio stations established in 1981
1981 establishments in British Columbia